Hanna is a 2011 action thriller film directed by Joe Wright. The film stars Saoirse Ronan as the title character, a girl raised in the wilderness of northern Finland by her father, an ex-CIA operative (Eric Bana), who trains her as an assassin. Cate Blanchett portrays a senior CIA agent who tries to track down and eliminate the girl and her father. The soundtrack was written by The Chemical Brothers.

Hanna was released in North America in April 2011 and in Europe in May 2011. It received generally positive reviews. Reviewers praised the performances of Ronan and Blanchett as well as the action sequences and themes.

Plot
Hanna Heller is a fifteen-year-old girl who lives with her father, Erik, in rural northern Finland. Since the age of two, Hanna has been trained by him, an ex-CIA operative from Germany, to be a skilled assassin. He teaches her hand-to-hand combat and drills her in target shooting. Erik knows a secret that cannot become public and Marissa Wiegler, a senior CIA officer, seeks to eliminate him.

Erik has trained Hanna with the intent to kill Marissa. One night, she tells him she is "ready" to face their enemies. Erik digs up a radio beacon that will alert the CIA to their presence. Although he warns Hanna that a confrontation with Marissa will be fatal for either her or Marissa, he leaves the final decision to her and she activates the beacon. Erik leaves, instructing her to meet him in Berlin.

Hanna is seized by special forces and taken to an underground CIA complex where a suspicious Marissa sends a decoy to interrogate Hanna when she asks for her by name. While talking to the double, Hanna starts to cry and embraces her tightly, which makes her captors uneasy. They send guards to sedate her.

As they enter the cell, Hanna kills the double along with some guards and escapes, discovering that she is in Morocco. Hanna meets Sebastian and Rachel, who are on a camper-van holiday with their children, Sophie and Miles, and stows away in the vehicle on a ferry to Spain, seeking to reach Berlin. The family is kind to her, and she and Sophie become friends: Hanna even tells her about the Berlin rendezvous and they kiss.

Marissa hires Isaacs, a sadistic former agent, to capture Hanna while other agents are searching for Erik. She kills Hanna's maternal grandmother after failing to learn anything useful from her. Isaacs and two skinheads have discovered from the Moroccan hotelier with whom Hanna escaped and trail them. Cornering her and the family sometime down the road, Isaacs attacks but Hanna manages to escape after a vicious fight.

Marissa interrogates the family and discovers from Miles that Hanna is heading to Berlin. The family is never seen again. Meanwhile, in Berlin, Erik fights off an attempted assassination and tries but fails to kill Marissa.

Arriving at the rendezvous in an abandoned Berlin amusement park, Hanna meets Knepfler, an eccentric magician and friend of Erik's who lives there. Before Erik arrives, Marissa and Isaacs appear. Hanna escapes, but overhears comments that suggest Erik is not her biological father.

Hanna then goes to her grandmother's empty apartment where she finds Erik, who admits he is not her biological father but loves her as his own. He explains that he once recruited pregnant women into a CIA program where their children's DNA was enhanced to create super-soldiers. After the project was shut down, its subjects – all except Hanna – were eliminated.

Marissa and Isaacs arrive; Erik acts as a distraction to allow Hanna to escape. He kills Isaacs, but is shot dead by Marissa, who then returns to Knepfler's house in the abandoned amusement park and finds Hanna, who has just discovered Knepfler hanging dead upside-down, having been tortured to death by Isaacs. Hanna flees taking one of the arrows used to kill Knepfler.

After Hanna flees, she is cornered by Marissa. In a final confrontation, Hanna turns her back to Marissa who shoots at her; but Hanna wounds Marissa by shooting an arrow at her. A now-staggering Marissa, pursued by Hanna, trips, leaving her badly injured. Hanna picks up Marissa's gun and uses it to kill her with two shots — a method she had previously used while hunting a deer at the film's beginning.

Cast

 Saoirse Ronan as Hanna
 Eric Bana as Erik Heller
 Vicky Krieps as Johanna Zadek
 Cate Blanchett as Marissa Wiegler
 Paris Arrowsmith as CIA Tech #1
 John Macmillan as Lewis
 Tim Beckmann as Walt
 Paul Birchard as Bob
 Christian Malcolm as Head of Ops
 Jamie Beamish as Burton
 Tom Hodgkins as Monitor
 Vincent Montuel as Camp G Doctor #1
 Nathan Nolan as Camp G Doctor #2
 Michelle Dockery as False Marissa
 Jessica Barden as Sophie
 Aldo Maland as Miles
 Olivia Williams as Rachel
 Jason Flemyng as Sebastian
 Mohamed Majd as Moroccan Hotel Owner
 Tom Hollander as Isaacs
 Sebastian Hülk as Titch
 Joel Basman as Razor
 Mathias Harrebye-Brandt as Danish Policeman (as Mathias Harrebye Brandt)
 Álvaro Cervantes as Feliciano
 Marc Soto as Feliciano's Brother
 Gudrun Ritter as Katrin Zadek
 Martin Wuttke as Knepfler
 Rose Wakesho as Linda

Production
The film was co-produced by the American Holleran Company and German Studio Babelsberg, with financial support from various German film funds and the main distributor, Focus Features, which holds the copyright to the film.

Development
The film's story and script were written by Seth Lochhead while a student at Vancouver Film School. He wrote the original story and script on spec, and finalized the script in 2006, with David Farr providing later changes.

Danny Boyle and Alfonso Cuarón were previously attached to direct the film, before it was confirmed that Joe Wright would direct, after Ronan prompted the producers to consider him.

Filming
Most of the filming was done at Studio Babelsberg in Potsdam, but locations also included Lake Kitkajärvi in Kuusamo, Finland, several German locations (including Bad Tölz, the water bridge at Magdeburg, Köhlbrandbrücke and Reeperbahn in Hamburg, and various sites in Berlin, such as Kottbusser Tor, Görlitzer Bahnhof and Spreepark), as well as Ouarzazate and Essaouira in Morocco. We were shooting on a frozen lake, surrounded by pine trees covered in snow".

Themes and motifs
Reviewers remarked that the setting and style of Hanna significantly depart from a typical action movie. According to the official website, the film has "elements of dark fairy tales" woven into an "adventure thriller". Joe Wright, the director, has said that the movie's theme is a "fantasy" about "overcoming the dark side" during the "rites of passage" of adolescent maturation when a child transforms and "has to go into the world". He said that he was influenced by personal exposure every day as he grew up to "violent, dark, cautionary fairy tales" that "prepare children for the future obstacles in the wider world", as well as his "deep love for the mystical qualities of David Lynch movies", by the patterns of narrative that he prefers because of his dyslexia, and by working as a child in his parents' puppetry company.

In an interview with Film School Rejects, Wright acknowledged David Lynch as a major influence on Hanna and also pointed to The Chemical Brothers' score: "You can expect an extraordinarily loud, thumping, deeply funky score that will not disappoint". The music, including The Devil Is In The Beats and The Devil Is In The Details, underscores the movie's style, recalling Stanley Kubrick's A Clockwork Orange with musical motifs consistent with Wright's "fairy tale theme" of childhood innocence confronting the modern "synthetic" world. Several reviewers have commented that the movie has a hyper-stylized Kubrickian tone, reminiscent of A Clockwork Orange. The "Kubrick-esque" style includes Isaacs' "gleeful sadism... at times darkly comedic," a whistling villain reminiscent of Alex DeLarge. Joe Wright's "love of fairy tales and David Lynch movies" was seen as blending A Clockwork Orange  and the work of the Brothers Grimm.

Richard Roeper judged it to be a "surreal fairy tale" with "omnipresent symbolism". Matt Goldberg said it was "an effective and surreal dark fairy tale"... ..."with a dreamlike sensibility... ...Everything in the picture is slightly askew and provides immediacy to Hanna’s offbeat coming-of-age tale... ...a film that refuses to exist solely in the realm of reality or fairy tale... ...'gritty' realism simply isn’t worthy of the story he’s trying to tell." Fairy tale motifs are strewn through the film. In the "tightly-edited patchwork of visual iconography, allusion and symbolism" Wiegler is equated with the Big Bad Wolf or the queen in Snow White. "Classic fairy tale movie tropes abound;" for example, the camera spins in obvious circles as Hanna makes her escape from the underground government facility early in the film, "just as the young heroine’s world is spinning out of control." Peter Bradshaw found the fairy tale mythology "unsubtle". Conversely, some reviewers did not comment on the fairy tale elements, and others did so with expressive reservation.

Kyle Munkittrick of Discover magazine notes that Hanna is a "transhumanist hero". Despite being genetically engineered to have "high intelligence, muscle mass, and no pity", she is still a good-natured person. He says Hanna "symbolizes the contest between genetics and environment", or, "perhaps more familiarly, nature versus nurture".

Reception

Critical response
Hanna received a 71% rating on review aggregator website Rotten Tomatoes, based on 235 reviews, and an average rating of 6.86/10. The site's critical consensus states: "Fantastic acting and crisply choreographed action sequences propel this unique, cool take on the revenge thriller." On Metacritic, the film received a weighted average score of 65/100 based on 40 critics, indicating "generally favorable reviews". Justin Chang of Variety said that Hanna is "an exuberantly crafted chase thriller that pulses with energy from its adrenaline-pumping first minutes to its muted bang of a finish". Roger Ebert gave the film three and a half stars out of four, commenting "Wright combines his two genres into a stylish exercise that perversely includes some sentiment and insight".

Peter Bradshaw of The Guardian, on the other hand, gave the film two stars out of five, stating "With its wicked-witch performance from Cate Blanchett, its derivative premise, its bland Europudding location work and some frankly outrageous boredom, this will test everyone's patience." Kenneth Turan, of the Los Angeles Times, stated that the film "starts off like a house afire but soon burns itself out", adding that even though the film is "[b]lessed with considerable virtues, including a clever concept, crackling filmmaking and a charismatic star, it ultimately squanders all of them, undone by an unfortunate lack of subtlety and restraint".

Box office
According to The Hollywood Reporter, Hanna came in second place at the U.S. box office in its first weekend behind Hop. When the film closed on 7 July 2011, it had grossed $40.3 million in North America and $25.1 million in other territories, for a worldwide total of $65.3 million.

Awards and nominations

Soundtrack

The soundtrack album features a score composed by the British big beat duo, The Chemical Brothers.

TV series

In March 2017, David Farr announced that he would be writing a TV series based on the film. On May 23, 2017, Amazon officially ordered the series to production. The first episode was made available on Amazon Video as a time-limited preview on February 3, 2019. The full eight-episode first season was released on March 29, 2019. In April 2019, Amazon renewed the series for a second season which premiered July 3, 2020. In July 2020, the series was renewed for a third season which premiered November 24, 2021.

References

External links
 
 
 
 
 
 

2011 films
2011 action thriller films
2010s action adventure films
2010s chase films
2010s teen films
American action adventure films
American action thriller films
American adventure thriller films
American chase films
American survival films
American teen films
Babelsberg Studio films
British action thriller films
British action adventure films
British chase films
British teen films
English-language German films
Fictional genetically engineered characters
Films about the Central Intelligence Agency
Films about genetic engineering
Films directed by Joe Wright
Films set in Berlin
Films set in Finland
Films set in Lille
Films set in Morocco
Films set in Spain
Films shot in Bavaria
Films shot in Berlin
Films shot in Brandenburg
Films shot in Finland
Films shot in Hamburg
Films shot in Morocco
Films shot in Spain
German action thriller films
German action adventure films
German teen films
Girls with guns films
Techno-thriller films
Teen adventure films
Teen thriller films
Films about father–daughter relationships
2010s English-language films
2010s American films
2010s British films
2010s German films
Films scored by musical groups